Samuel Mackinnon (born 25 August 1976) is an Australian former basketball player and coach. He played in the National Basketball League (NBL) between 1994 and 2010. His athleticism above the rim saw him become known as 'Slammin' Sam Mackinnon.

Playing career
Born in Melbourne, Victoria, Mackinnon's career began in 1994 with the South East Melbourne Magic when he won NBL Rookie of the Year. Two seasons later, Mackinnon went to become one of the dominant players for South East Melbourne and they won the NBL championship in 1996.

After South East Melbourne folded, Mackinnon was signed by the Townsville Crocodiles at the beginning of the 1999 season, and it was not long before Townsville became serious title contenders. In 2001, Townsville made the Grand Final, however Mackinnon missed the series due to injury. Once his contract ended in Townsville, Mackinnon elected to sign with the West Sydney Razorbacks where he became their captain and put up career-best numbers in his first season. During the following season Mackinnon led West Sydney into the NBL Grand Final series against cross-town rivals the Sydney Kings. Sydney won the series 3–2.

In March 2005, Mackinnon signed with the Brisbane Bullets. He had career-best numbers during the 2006–07 season and led the Bullets to their first NBL championship in 20 years. He became the first player in league history to win the MVP, Best Defensive Player and Grand Final MVP in the same season.

During the 2007 NBL off-season there was much speculation concerning whether or not Mackinnon would be signed as a free agent in the National Basketball Association. In June 2007, Mackinnon was reported as having "completed trials with Champions San Antonio Spurs, runners-up Cleveland Cavaliers, the Toronto Raptors and the Miami Heat." On the weekend of 23–24 June 2007, the Toronto Raptors included Mackinnon in a list of free agents invited to a camp to help fill out their roster. Unfortunately, an offer of playing in the NBA did not materialize and Mackinnon re-signed with the Brisbane Bullets.

Knee injuries sidelined him for most of the 2007–08 season. On 8 July 2008, the Melbourne Tigers announced they had signed Mackinnon to a three-year deal.

Mackinnon retired from the NBL following the 2009–10 season.

National team career
Mackinnon was a regular member of the Boomers squad, that saw him compete in the 1996, 2000 and 2004 Olympic Games. Perhaps his greatest achievement whilst playing for Australia was winning a gold medal during the 2006 Commonwealth Games. In 2007 Mackinnon was also named captain of the Boomers squad for the 2008 Beijing Olympics Qualifying Series against New Zealand.

Coaching career
On 30 July 2017, Mackinnon returned to the Brisbane Bullets as an assistant coach. He remained as an assistant with the Bullets until 2020, when he moved into the front office. In November 2022, he took on the role of the Bullets' interim head coach after the team parted ways with James Duncan. He handed over the interim coach reins to Greg Vanderjagt on 13 December 2022. His tenure as General Manager of Basketball at the Bullets ended in February 2023.

Awards
NBL Rookie of the Year (1994)
NBL Best Defensive Player (2007)
NBL Most Valuable Player (2007)
NBL Grand Final MVP (2007)
Australian International Player of the Year (2007)

References

1976 births
Living people
Australian men's basketball coaches
Australian men's basketball players
Basketball players at the 1996 Summer Olympics
Basketball players at the 2000 Summer Olympics
Basket Rimini Crabs players
Brisbane Bullets coaches
Brisbane Bullets players
Commonwealth Games gold medallists for Australia
Commonwealth Games medallists in basketball
Melbourne Tigers players
Olympic basketball players of Australia
South East Melbourne Magic players
Townsville Crocodiles players
West Sydney Razorbacks players
2006 FIBA World Championship players
1998 FIBA World Championship players
Basketball players at the 2006 Commonwealth Games
Small forwards
Shooting guards
Medallists at the 2006 Commonwealth Games